Lierne National Park lies in the municipality of Lierne in Trøndelag county, Norway. The  park was established on 17 December 2004 by a royal resolution.

The park is dominated by a large mountainous region rich in lynx, wolverines, bears, and wildfowl. The rare Arctic fox also lives in the area. Much of the land was formed during the last ice age. There are many wetland areas with large swamps and open woodlands.

References

External links
Lierne National Park

National parks of Norway
Protected areas established in 2004
Lierne
Protected areas of Trøndelag
Tourist attractions in Trøndelag
2004 establishments in Norway